The Canton of Brantôme en Périgord (before March 2020: canton of Brantôme) is a canton of the Dordogne department, in France. The lowest point is 63 m, and the highest point is 251 m. At the French canton reorganisation which came into effect in March 2015, the canton of Brantôme was expanded from 11 to 42 communes (17 of which merged into the new communes Brantôme en Périgord and Mareuil en Périgord):

Biras
Bourdeilles
Brantôme en Périgord
Bussac
Chapdeuil
Champagnac-de-Belair
La Chapelle-Faucher
La Chapelle-Montmoreau
Condat-sur-Trincou
Creyssac
Douchapt
Grand-Brassac
Lisle
Mareuil en Périgord
Montagrier
Paussac-et-Saint-Vivien
Quinsac
La Rochebeaucourt-et-Argentine
Rudeau-Ladosse
Saint-Félix-de-Bourdeilles
Saint-Just
Saint-Pancrace
Saint-Victor
Sainte-Croix-de-Mareuil
Segonzac
Tocane-Saint-Apre
Villars

Population history

See also 
 Cantons of the Dordogne department

References

Cantons of Dordogne